Second Chance, A Second Chance, The Second Chance, or 2nd Chance may refer to:

Film
 Second Chance (1947 film), an American film noir
 Second Chance (1950 film), an American Christian film
 Second Chance (1953 film), an American film noir by Rudolph Maté
 Second Chance (1972 film), an American television film
 Second Chance (1976 film), a French film by Claude Lelouch
 Second Chance (1996 film), an American film by Lyman Dayton
 Second Chance (2005 film), an Australian television film written by John Misto
  The Second Chance, a 2006 drama film by Steve Taylor
 Second Chance (2010 film), a short drama film featuring Aml Ameen

 A Second Chance (2014 film), a Danish film
 A Second Chance (2015 film), a Filipino film

 2nd Chance, 2022 documentary film directed by Ramin Bahrani, about the body armor company

Literature 
 Second Chance: Three Presidents and the Crisis of American Superpower, a 2007 book by Zbigniew Brzezinski
 "Second Chance" (short story), a 1979 story by Orson Scott Card
 2nd Chance (Patterson novel), a 2003 Women's Murder Club novel by James Patterson
 Second Chance (Steel novel), a 2004 novel by Danielle Steel
 Second Chance, a 2012 Slayer Chronicles novel by Heather Brewer
 Second Chance, a 2007 novel by Jane Green
 Second Chance, a 1998 Left Behind: The Kids novel by Jerry B. Jenkins

Music 
 Second Chance (musical), a 2009 rock opera by Stéphane Prémont and Frédérick Desroches
 Second Chance (Melodifestivalen), a round in the Swedish competition Melodifestivalen
 Just Surrender, formerly A Second Chance, a 2000s American rock band

Albums 
 Second Chance (El DeBarge album) or the title song, 2010
 Second Chance (Marc Douglas Berardo album) or the title song, 2000
 Second Chance (Noah album), 2014
 2nd Chance (Karen Clark Sheard album) or the title song, 2002
 2nd Chance (Oxide & Neutrino album) or the title song, 2007

Songs 
 "Second Chance" (38 Special song), 1989
 "Second Chance" (Faber Drive song), 2007
 "Second Chance" (Shinedown song), 2008
 "Second Chance" (Tinchy Stryder song), 2010
 "Second Chance", by Caribou from Our Love, 2014
 "Second Chance", by Disclosure from Settle, 2013
 "Second Chance", by Liam Finn from I'll Be Lightning, 2007
 "Second Chance", by Paul Anka, 1984
 "Second Chance", by Peter Bjorn and John from Gimme Some, 2011
 "Second Chance", by Rend Collective Experiment from Homemade Worship by Handmade People, 2012
 "Second Chance (Don't Back Down)", by T-Pain from Oblivion, 2017

Television

Programs
 Second Chance (1987 TV series), an American sitcom starring Matthew Perry
 Second Chance  (2016 TV series), an American science fiction drama starring Rob Kazinsky
 Second Chance (game show), a 1977 American game show
 Second Chance (NTV drama series), a 2016–2018 Ugandan remake of El Cuerpo del Deseo
 El Cuerpo del Deseo or Second Chance, a 2005–2006 American Spanish-language telenovela
 Survivor: Second Chance or Survivor: Cambodia, a season of Survivor
 Second Chance!, a Nigerian comedy based on Mind Your Language

Episodes
 "Second Chance" (Batman: The Animated Series), 1994
 "Second Chance" (The Outer Limits), 1964
 "Second Chance!" (The Raccoons), 1989
 "A Second Chance" (Roseanne), 1997
 "The Second Chance" (The O.C.), 2005

Other uses 
 Second Chance (body armor), a manufacturer of bullet-resistant vests
 Second Chance Act (2007), U.S. legislation concerning recidivism prevention
 Second Chance Program, a prison rehabilitation and detoxification program based on the works of L. Ron Hubbard
 Second-chance algorithm, a page-replacement algorithm in computer science
 Second Chance, a cloned Brahman bull
 2nd Chance Motorsports, a 2010–2011 NASCAR team

See also 
 Second Chances (disambiguation)